New Decade, New Approach (NDNA) is a 9 January 2020 agreement which restored the government of the Northern Ireland Executive after a three-year hiatus triggered by the Renewable Heat Incentive scandal. It was negotiated by Secretary of State for Northern Ireland Julian Smith and Irish Tánaiste Simon Coveney.

On 11 January 2020, the Executive was re-formed with Arlene Foster as First Minister and Sinn Féin's Michelle O'Neill as deputy first minister following the New Decade, New Approach agreement. All five parties joined the government; other ministers include Edwin Poots (DUP); Robin Swann (UUP), Nichola Mallon (SDLP), Gordon Lyons (DUP), and Declan Kearney (SF). Alliance Party leader Naomi Long was appointed justice minister. At the first session of the assembly, Foster stated that it was "time for Stormont to move forward".

As part of the agreement, many of the proposals sought by nationalists under an Irish Language Act would be implemented by amending existing laws rather than introducing a new standalone law. Many other aspects of the policy were included in the deal.

Background

Renewable Heat Incentive scandal 

The Renewable Heat Incentive (RHI) scandal related to the cost of a renewable energy scheme initiated by Arlene Foster during her tenure as Minister for Enterprise, Trade and Investment. The scandal came to light in November 2016, when Foster was First Minister of Northern Ireland. Foster refused to stand aside during the enquiry, ultimately leading to the resignation of Martin McGuinness, deputy First Minister, which, under the Northern Ireland power-sharing agreement, led to the collapse of the Northern Ireland executive in January 2017.

Collapse of the Northern Ireland Executive 

Following the collapse of the Northern Ireland executive, snap elections were held. These elections were the first in the history of Northern Ireland where unionist parties did not win a majority: this was attributed to the RHI scandal, the role of the DUP in Brexit, and demographic shifts. Under the Northern Ireland Act 1998 a further election must be held within six weeks if no executive is formed. Following the elections, talks were held and facilitated by the British and Irish Governments in order to restore the devolved administration in Northern Ireland. During this time there were two Secretaries of State for Northern Ireland: James Brokenshire and Karen Bradley, who all failed to restore the executive. In order to prevent further re-elections the British Parliament passed the Northern Ireland (Ministerial Appointments and Regional Rates) Act 2017 and Northern Ireland (Executive Formation and Exercise of Functions) Act 2018 which provided for further extensions to the deadline set in the 1998 Act, as well legislating for devolved issues such as taxation. Following the 2018 Act, the Northern Ireland (Executive Formation etc) Act 2019 was introduced to parliament to extend the deadline further. Secretary of State Julian Smith eventually restored the Executive in January 2020 under the terms of the New Decade, New Approach agreement.

Irish Language Act 

Sinn Féin, the SDLP, the Alliance Party, and the Green Party, support an Irish Language Act, which is opposed by the Democratic Unionist Party and Ulster Unionist Party. The Irish Language Act is proposed legislation  that would give the Irish language equal status to English in the region, similar to that of the Welsh language in Wales under the Welsh Language Act 1993.

Gerry Adams, then Sinn Féin leader, stated in August 2017 that "There won't be an assembly without an Acht na Gaeilge." According to The Independent in 2019, the Irish Language Act has become the most public issue of disagreement in discussions about restoring Stormont, and it is "almost certainly" required for a deal to be made to end the deadlock.

Agreement
On 11 January 2020, Sinn Féin and the DUP re-entered devolved government under the New Decade, New Approach agreement with DUP leader Arlene Foster appointed Northern Ireland's first minister, and Sinn Féin's Michelle O'Neill appointed deputy first minister.

Irish language and Ulster Scots
As part of the agreement, there will be no standalone Irish Language Act, but the Northern Ireland Act 1998 will be amended and policies implemented to:
grant official status to both the Irish language and Ulster Scots in Northern Ireland; 
establish the post of Irish Language Commissioner to "recognise, support, protect and enhance the development of the Irish language in Northern Ireland" as part of a new Office of Identity and Cultural Expression (alongside an Ulster Scots/Ulster British Commissioner); 
introduce sliding-scale "language standards", a similar approach to that taken for the Welsh language in Wales, although they are subject to veto by the First Minister or deputy First Minister;
repeal a 1737 ban on the use of Irish in Northern Ireland's courts; 
 allow members of the Northern Ireland Assembly to speak in Irish or Ulster Scots, with simultaneous translation for non-speakers, and 
establish a central translation unit within the Northern Ireland government.

Section 27 of the NDNA affirms the right of Northern Irish people to identify as Irish, British, or both, and promises “legislation to create a Commissioner to recognise, support, protect and enhance the development of the Irish language in Northern Ireland” and a second Commissioner “to enhance and develop the language, arts and literature associated with the Ulster Scots / Ulster British tradition”. The Assembly's Standing Orders would be amended to allow business to be conducted in the Assembly and its Committees in Irish or Ulster Scots, and a simultaneous translation system would be provided.

Aftermath 
First Minister Arlene Foster resigned in May 2021 after the DUP signaled a no-confidence vote would be held against her. She was replaced by former Minister of Communities Paul Givan on 17 June 2021, with O'Neill staying on as deputy first minister. However, Givan himself resigned in protest in February 2022 over disputes with Westminster concerning the Northern Ireland Protocol, with early elections called for 7 May 2022. No legislation was held on the contents of the Irish Language Act prior to the 2022 Assembly election.

The Northern Ireland (Ministers, Elections and Petitions of Concern) Act 2022 was passed by the UK Parliament to implement parts of the agreement.

References

External links
UK Government Press Release, GOV.UK
Full text of New Decade, New Approach, GOV.UK

January 2020 events in the United Kingdom
Northern Ireland Executive